LayerWalker Technology, Inc. is a fabless integrated circuit design company that announced a network storage system on a chip (SoC). Their products targeted digital home, small business and consumer electronics markets.

LayerWalker introduced in 2007 the miniSAN product that provided ATA over Ethernet (AoE) server functions and management capabilities. Client software and drivers for Windows and Linux operating systems were offered.

LayerWalker had offices in Taipei. It was founded in 2005 and had a web site through 2012.

References

External links
 The ATA-over-Ethernet initiator is part of the mainline Linux kernel since 2.6.11
 Kernel Korner - ATA Over Ethernet: Putting Hard Drives on the LAN
 
 Ben Rockwood: ATA Vs. iSCSI 

Computer storage companies
Storage area networks